HMS Union was a British U class submarine, of the second group of that class, built by Vickers Armstrong, Barrow-in-Furness. She was laid down on 9 December 1939 and was commissioned on 22 February 1941.

Career and sinking
Union spent much of her short career operating in the Mediterranean, where she sank the Italian merchant Pietro Querini. Her success was short-lived however. Union sailed from Malta at 1 o’clock on the morning of 14 July 1941 with orders to intercept a convoy north of Tripoli the following day. When Union failed to return to Malta she was reported overdue on 22 July 1941.

References

External links
 The abandoned Pietro Querini photographed by a Malta-based RAF Blenheim. The vessel later sank

 

British U-class submarines
Ships built in Barrow-in-Furness
1940 ships
World War II submarines of the United Kingdom
World War II shipwrecks in the Mediterranean Sea
Lost submarines of the United Kingdom
Ships lost with all hands
Maritime incidents in July 1941
Submarines sunk by Italian warships